Shavers Fork of the Cheat River is situated in the Allegheny Mountains of eastern West Virginia, USA. It is 88.5 mi (142.5 km) long and forms the Cheat at its confluence with Black Fork at Parsons. It was traditionally considered one of the five Forks of Cheat and its upper reaches constitute the highest river in the eastern United States.

Geography
Shavers Fork, via the Cheat, Monongahela and Ohio Rivers, is part of the watershed of the Mississippi River, draining an area of 214 mi² (554 km²).  It flows for much of its length through the Monongahela National Forest, and drains mostly rural and forested areas.  97% of the river's basin is forested, and two-thirds of it is public land.

Shavers Fork rises in north-central Pocahontas County at Thorny Flat, highest peak of Cheat Mountain (4,848 ft/1,478 m) and the site of Snowshoe Mountain ski resort. Its headwaters flow through the ghost town of Spruce. The river then flows generally north-northeastwardly through Randolph and Tucker Counties, where its valley is the trough between Cheat Mountain (to the west) and Shavers Mountain (to the east). Settlements along its course include Cheat Bridge, Bemis, Bowden, and Porterwood. The "High Falls of Cheat" (15 feet [4.6 m] high) is a few miles upstream of Bemis. Shavers Fork ultimately joins the Black Fork at Parsons to form the Cheat at an elevation of 1621 ft (494 m).

Names

The creek was named after the local Shaver family. According to the Geographic Names Information System, Shavers Fork has also been known historically as:
Chavers Fork 
Main Cheat River 
Shafers Fork 
Shaffers Fork of Cheat River 
Shaver's Fork 
Shavers Fork River 
Shavers Fork of Cheat River

See also
List of West Virginia rivers
List of waterfalls in West Virginia

References

External links
The Nature Conservancy's Upper Shavers Fork Preserve 

Rivers of West Virginia
Monongahela National Forest
Rivers of Pocahontas County, West Virginia
Rivers of Randolph County, West Virginia
Rivers of Tucker County, West Virginia